Priston Mill is a watermill in the district of Somerset, England. A Grade II listed building, it is near the city of Bath and currently serves as a venue for weddings and other gatherings.

History 
A Priston Mill was granted by the king to the monks of Bath Abbey in 931, though the current structure dates from the 18th century. It is powered by a 25-foot (8 m) overshot water wheel and is maintained in working condition.

Tithe barn 
Priston Mill also has a tithe barn that was created in the late 18th to 19th century. Like the mill itself, the barn is Grade II listed.

References

Watermills in England
Bath, Somerset